Nathaniel Wood (born August 5, 1993) is an English mixed martial artist who competes in the Featherweight division of the Ultimate Fighting Championship (UFC). A professional competitor since 2012, he formerly competed for Cage Warriors, where he was the Bantamweight Champion.

Background
Growing up playing football, Wood followed his father to a Brazilian jiu-jitsu practise at the age of 16. He attended college for carpentry for a spell, but dropped out in order to pursue a career in mixed martial arts.

Professional mixed martial arts career

Early career
Wood made his professional debut against James Humphries at Fusion Fighting Championship: Breakthrough on February 18, 2012. He won the fight by a second-round technical knockout. He went on to amass a 9–3 record, before signing with Cage Warriors.

Cage Warriors Bantamweight champion

Wood was scheduled to make his Cage Warriors debut against Vaughan Lee at CWFC 82 on April 1, 2017. They were originally scheduled to meet at CWFC 80, before the fight was postponed due to an anomaly found on Wood's brain in a pre-fight scan. Wood staggered Lee near the beginning of the second round, and pursued him for the remainder of the fight, knocking him out with a right straight at the 4:22 minute mark.

Following his dominant victory against Lee, Wood was scheduled to fight Marko Kovacevic for the vacant Cage Warriors Bantamweight Championship at CWFC 84 on June 2, 2017. Wood won the fight by a first-round technical knockout, after weathering some early counter right hands by Kovacic.

Wood was scheduled to make his first title defense against Josh Reed at CWFC 86 on September 17, 2017. Reed dominated the champion for the duration of the short-lived bout, surging forward with power shots and managing to drop Wood with a combination of punches. Wood however managed to stagger back to his feet and counter the onrushing Reed with a counter left, winning the fight by a first-round knockout.

Wood made his second and final title defense against Luca Iovine at CWFC 92 on March 24, 2018. Wood made quick work of the challenger, knocking him out with a left hook after just 50 seconds.

It was announced on April 5, 2018, that Wood had signed with the UFC.

Ultimate Fighting Championship

Wood made his promotional debut against Johnny Eduardo on 1 June 2018 at UFC Fight Night: Rivera vs. Moraes. He won the fight via submission in Round 2, for which he was awarded with a Performance of the Night bonus.

Wood was originally scheduled to face Tom Duquesnoy on 29 December 2018 at UFC 232. However, Dusquenoy pulled out due to an injury and was replaced by Andre Ewell. He won the bout via submission in the third round.

Wood faced José Alberto Quiñónez on 16 March 2019 at UFC Fight Night: Till vs. Masvidal. He won the fight via a submission in round two.

Wood faced John Dodson on 15 February 2020 at UFC Fight Night: Anderson vs. Błachowicz 2. He lost the fight via TKO in round three.

Wood was scheduled to face Umar Nurmagomedov on 26 July 2020 at UFC on ESPN 14. However, Nurmagomedov withdrew from the bout due to his uncle Abdulmanap Nurmagomedov's passing   He was replaced by promotional newcomer John Castañeda. Wood won the fight via unanimous decision.

Wood faced Casey Kenney on 24 October 2020 at UFC 254. He lost the back-and-forth fight via unanimous decision. This fight earned him the Fight of the Night award.

Wood was scheduled to face Jonathan Martinez on 4 September 2021 at UFC Fight Night 191. However, Wood was removed from the bout in mid-August for undisclosed reasons and replaced by Marcelo Rojo.

Wood was scheduled to face Liudvik Sholinian on 19 March 2022 at UFC Fight Night 204. However due to the War in Ukraine, Sholinian was unable to leave the country or train so he was replaced by Vince Morales. In turn, just days before the event, Morales withdrew due to illness, and the pair will be rescheduled for future event.

In his debut at featherweight, Wood faced Charles Rosa on 23 July 2022 at UFC Fight Night 208. He won the fight by unanimous decision.

Wood faced Charles Jourdain on September at UFC Fight Night 209. He won the fight via unanimous decision.

Wood was scheduled to face Lerone Murphy on March 18, 2023 at UFC 286. However, Wood was forced to withdraw from the event due to leg injury.

Championships and accomplishments

Mixed martial arts
Ultimate Fighting Championship
Performance of the Night (One time) 
Fight of the Night (One time) 
Cage Warriors
Cage Warriors Bantamweight Championship (One time; first)
Two successful title defenses
MMAjunkie.com
2020 October Fight of the Month

Mixed martial arts record

|-
|Win
|align=center|19–5
|Charles Jourdain
|Decision (unanimous)
|UFC Fight Night: Gane vs. Tuivasa
|
|align=center|3
|align=center|5:00
|Paris, France
|
|-
|Win
|align=center|18–5
|Charles Rosa
|Decision (unanimous)
|UFC Fight Night: Blaydes vs. Aspinall 
|
|align=center|3
|align=center|5:00
|London, England
|
|-
|Loss
|align=center|17–5
|Casey Kenney
|Decision (unanimous)
|UFC 254
|
|align=center|3
|align=center|5:00
|Abu Dhabi, United Arab Emirates
|
|-
|Win
|align=center|17–4
|John Castañeda
|Decision (unanimous)
|UFC on ESPN: Whittaker vs. Till 
|
|align=center|3
|align=center|5:00
|Abu Dhabi, United Arab Emirates
|  
|-
|Loss
|align=center|16–4
|John Dodson
|TKO (punches)
|UFC Fight Night: Anderson vs. Błachowicz 2 
|
|align=center|3
|align=center|0:16
|Rio Rancho, New Mexico, United States
|
|-
|Win
|align=center|16–3
|José Alberto Quiñónez
|Submission (rear-naked choke)
|UFC Fight Night: Till vs. Masvidal 
|
|align=center|2
|align=center|2:46
|London, England
|
|-
|Win
|align=center|15–3
|Andre Ewell
|Submission (rear-naked choke)
|UFC 232 
|
|align=center|3
|align=center|4:12
|Inglewood, California, United States
| 
|-
|Win
|align=center|14–3
|Johnny Eduardo
|Submission (D'Arce choke)
|UFC Fight Night: Rivera vs. Moraes 
|
|align=center|2
|align=center|2:18
|Utica, New York, United States
|
|-
|Win
|align=center|13–3
|Luca Iovine
|KO (punch)
|Cage Warriors 92
|
|align=center|1
|align=center|0:50
|London, England
| 
|-
|Win
|align=center|12–3
|Josh Reed
|TKO (punches)
|Cage Warriors 86
|
|align=center|1
|align=center|2:19
|London, England
| 
|-
|Win
|align=center|11–3
|Marko Kovacevic
|KO (punches)
|Cage Warriors 84
|
|align=center|1
|align=center|3:41
|London, England
| 
|-
|Win
|align=center|10–3
|Vaughan Lee
|TKO (punches)
|Cage Warriors 82 
|
|align=center|2
|align=center|4:22
|Liverpool, England
|
|-
| Win
| align=center| 9–3
| Chase Morton
| Submission (rear naked choke)
| Bellator 158
| 
| align=center| 2
| align=center| 0:48
|London, England
|
|-
| Loss
| align=center| 8–3
| Alan Philpott
| TKO (doctor stoppage)
| BAMMA 24: Ireland vs. England
| 
| align=center|3
| align=center| 3:40
| Dublin, Ireland
|
|-
| Win
| align=center| 8–2
| Bryan Creighton
| Decision (unanimous)
| BAMMA 23: Night of Champions
| 
| align=center| 3
| align=center| 5:00
| Birmingham, England
|
|-
| Win
| align=center| 7–2
| Thiago Aguiar
| Decision (unanimous)
| Phoenix Fight Night 27
| 
| align=center| 3
| align=center| 5:00
| Bournemouth, England
|
|-
| Loss
| align=center| 6–2
| Mike Cutting
| Submission (armbar)
| BAMMA 18: Duquesnoy vs. Klaczek
| 
| align=center| 1
| align=center| 3:26
| Wolverhampton, England
| 
|-
| Win
| align=center| 6–1
| Steve McCombe
| TKO (arm injury)
| Cage Warriors 74
| 
| align=center| 1
| align=center| 2:23
| London, England
| 
|-
| Win
| align=center| 5–1
| Alexander Bilobrovka
| Submission (triangle choke)
| UCMMA 39
| 
| align=center| 1
| align=center| 0:34
| London, England
| 
|-
| Loss
| align=center| 4–1
| Ed Arthur
| Submission (rear naked choke)
| BAMMA 15: Thompson vs. Selmani
| 
| align=center| 3
| align=center| 1:48
| London, England
| 
|-
| Win
| align=center| 4–0
| Abdullah Saleh
| KO
| UCMMA 38
| 
| align=center| 1
| align=center| 0:22
| London, England
| 
|-
| Win
| align=center| 3–0
| Grisha Adams
| Submission (triangle choke)
| UCMMA 35
| 
| align=center| 1
| align=center| 3:01
| London, England
| 
|-
| Win
| align=center| 2–0
| Damo Weeden
| TKO (punches)
| Fusion Fighting Championship - Reality Check
| 
| align=center| 2
| align=center| 2:10
| Epsom, England
| 
|-
| Win
| align=center| 1–0
| James Humphries
| TKO (punches)
| Fusion Fighting Championship: Breakthrough
| 
| align=center| 2
| align=center| 0:33
| Epsom, England
| 
|-
|}

See also
 List of current UFC fighters
 List of male mixed martial artists

References

External links 
 
 

1993 births
Living people
Bantamweight mixed martial artists
English male mixed martial artists
Mixed martial artists utilizing Muay Thai
Mixed martial artists utilizing Brazilian jiu-jitsu
English Muay Thai practitioners
English practitioners of Brazilian jiu-jitsu
Ultimate Fighting Championship male fighters